Carl Lund may refer to:

 Carl Lund (industrialist) (1846–1912), industrialist
 Carl Lund (painter) (1855–1940), Danish scenic designer
 Carl Lund (wrestler) (1884–1940), Swedish wrestler